Soumans is a commune in the Creuse department in the Nouvelle-Aquitaine region in central France.

Geography
The commune shares a border with the Allier département.

Population

Sights
 The church, dating from the twelfth century.
 The Château de Bellefaye.
 The thirteenth-century church at Bellefaye.

See also
Communes of the Creuse department

References

Communes of Creuse
County of La Marche